The 2013 Women's Australian Hockey League was the 21st edition of the women's field hockey tournament. The tournament was held in the Tasmania city of Hobart.

The Queensland Scorchers won the gold medal for the fourth time by defeating the WA Diamonds 2–0 in a penalty shoot-out, after the final ended a 0–0 draw.

Competition format

The tournament is divided into two pools, Pool A and Pool B, consisting of four teams in a round-robin format. Teams then progress into either Pool C, the medal round, or Pool D, the classification round. Teams carry over points from their previous match ups, and contest teams they are yet to play.

The top two teams in each of pools A and B then progress to Pool C. The top two teams in Pool C continue to contest the Final, while the bottom two teams of Pool C play in the Third and Fourth-place match.

The remaining bottom placing teams make up Pool D. The top two teams in Pool D play in the Fifth and Sixth-place match, while the bottom two teams of Pool C play in the Seventh and Eighth-place match.

Teams

  Canberra Strikers
  NSW Arrows
  NT Pearls
  QLD Scorchers
  SA Suns
  Tassie Van Demons
  VIC Vipers
  WA Diamonds

Results

First round

Pool A

Pool B

Second round

Pool C (Medal Round)

Pool D (Classification Round)

Classification matches

Seventh and eighth place

Fifth and Sixth place

Third and fourth place

Final

Awards

Statistics

Final standings

Goalscorers

References

External links

2013
2013 in Australian women's field hockey